Ferodo is a British brake company based in Chapel-en-le-Frith in High Peak, Derbyshire.

History

It was founded in 1897 by Herbert Frood (1864-1931), with manufacturing starting in Gorton in 1901 and moving to Chapel-en-le-Frith in 1902. Ferodo was the first company to use asbestos for brake linings and developed the first modern brake friction materials.

Ferodo UK became part of Turner & Newall in 1926.  It had a factory at Chapel-en-le-Frith and in 1964 opened another at Caernarfon.

In 1998 Turner & Newall was acquired by the huge automotive group Federal-Mogul. It is now part of Federal-Mogul Aftermarket UK Limited. In 2012 £13m was invested in new floors, insulation, low energy heating and new process machines.

Asbestos trust
Federal-Mogul got into financial difficulties and filed for Chapter 11 protection as a result of asbestosis claims. In the United Kingdom the business went into administration in October 2001, leaving a pension fund deficit estimated at £400 million.

The T&N Subfund of the Federal-Mogul Asbestos Trust was organized to pay all valid Asbestos Trust claims for which the T&N Entities have legal responsibility. The Trust was created December 27, 2007 as a result of the confirmation of The Federal-Mogul Chapter 11 Joint Plan of Reorganization.

For claimants whose principal exposure to asbestos was in the United Kingdom or one of several other non-US countries, a UK Asbestos Trust was established to provide for the payment of asbestos claims in addition to the US-focused Asbestos Trust described above. This includes posthumous payments to families of Ferodo factory workers.

Advertising
Ferodo is famous in Britain for advertising by having the Ferodo brand name painted on railway bridges over main roads.

References

External links
 
 Peakland Heritage - a brief history of Henry Frood and Ferodo
 Geograph photo of Chapel factory entrance
 Geograph photo of former Caernarfon factory closed in 2004

Auto parts suppliers of the United Kingdom
Brakes
Manufacturing companies established in 1897
Companies based in Derbyshire
1897 establishments in England